The Selsdon Group is a British free-market economics pressure group, closely associated with the Conservative Party. Selsdon Group members believe that economic freedom is the indispensable condition for political and social freedom. The group's President is the Rt. Hon. John Redwood MP.

It was created in 1973 by a group of young libertarian Conservatives, with David Alexander as first chairman and Nicholas Ridley as first president, in order to promote free-market economic policies. This followed a conference held in January 1970 by Edward Heath and his shadow cabinet at the Selsdon Park Hotel in Selsdon, with the purpose of generating fresh policy ideas. The Selsdon Group took its name from this event.

The result of the 1970 discussions was a radical free-market agenda, ridiculed by the then Labour Prime Minister Harold Wilson as the work of "Selsdon Man". Wilson lost the subsequent general election to Heath. After a short period, however, Heath abandoned the 1970 manifesto in the face of bitter opposition from the trade unions. This historic U-turn was the catalyst for the formation of the Selsdon Group in 1973. A handful of young libertarian Conservatives, including David Alexander, Stephen Eyres, Philip Vander Elst, Anthony Vander Elst, and Richard S. Henderson created the new group, with Nicholas Ridley as president, in order to uphold and promote the free-market policies that they believed had won the Conservative Party the 1970 general election.

The "Selsdon Declaration", to which all members must subscribe, was adopted at the Selsdon Group's first meeting, held at the Selsdon Park Hotel in September 1973. Nicholas Ridley closed his keynote speech at that meeting by citing the "Ten Cannots" of William J. H. Boetcker, adding that it "could well become the guiding principle of the Selsdon Group". (As often occurs with citations of Boetcker's document, Ridley wrongly attributed the quotation to Abraham Lincoln.) Early members informally stressed that the Group commemorated and advanced the general principles of the Selsdon Declaration, rather than the detail of what they regarded as an inadequate document.

The group was criticised by many figures within the Conservative Party establishment at the time. Many of its policies, however, influenced later governments led by Margaret Thatcher and John Major.

See also
Selsdon

References

External links
Selsdon Group

1973 establishments in the United Kingdom
Political and economic think tanks based in the United Kingdom
Organisations associated with the Conservative Party (UK)
Organizations established in 1973